Viktorija Golubic and Aliaksandra Sasnovich were the defending champions, but chose not to participate this year.
Martina Hingis and Sania Mirza won the title, defeating Vera Dushevina and Barbora Krejčíková in the final, 6–3, 6–1.

Seeds

Draw

References 
 Main Draw

St. Petersburg Ladies' Trophy
St. Petersburg Ladies' Trophy - Doubles